The Weather is a collaborative studio album by Busdriver & Radioinactive with Daedelus. It was released on Mush Records on February 18, 2003.

Daedelus released a reworking instrumental version of the album, titled Rethinking the Weather, on Mush Records on June 10, 2003.

Critical reception
Julianne Shepherd of Pitchfork praised the album, writing, "The Weather is smart but not pretentious, skeptical but not misanthropic, and it proves avant-hiphop doesn't have to be avant-crappy." Meanwhile, Fredrick Thomas of Stylus Magazine criticized the album's consistency, writing: "It's not that any track on the album is actually bad when compared to artists doing similar work – it's just that it does nothing to differentiate them from the pack."

Eric K. Arnold of East Bay Express said, "Busdriver and Radioinactive's rhyming cadences owe a debt to both Freestyle Fellowship and Latyrx, while Daedelus' lo-fi Casio tones could qualify him for at least a charter membership in Anticon."

Track listing

Personnel
Credits adapted from liner notes.

 Busdriver – vocals, jacket zipper (2), party noisemaker (2)
 Radioinactive – vocals, gargle (5)
 Daedelus – production
 DJ ESP – turntables
 Rhetteric – vocals (4)
 Anita Qureshi – vocals (5)
 Myka 9 – whistle (7)
 Awol One – vocals (15)
 2Mex – vocals (15)
 Circus – vocals (15)
 Daddy Kev – mixing

References

Further reading

External links
 

2003 albums
Collaborative albums
Busdriver albums
Radioinactive albums
Daedelus (musician) albums
Mush Records albums